Dirk Fabriek (born 2 April 1985) is Dutch motorcycle racer who competes in longtrack and Grasstrack.

World Longtrack Championship

Grand-Prix Years
 2004 - 4 apps (21st) 10pts
 2005 - 1 apps (25th) 1pt
 2007 - 3 apps (10th) 32pts
 2008 - 4 apps (Third) 65pts
 2009 - 5 apps (Third) 81pts
 2010 - 6 apps (15th) 46pts
 2011 - 6 apps (10th) 59pts
 2013 - 6 apps (10th) 75pts
 2014 - 4 apps (8th) 40pts
 2015 - 4 apps (16th) 21pts
 2016 - 1 apps (16th) 16pts

Semi-final
 2006

Best Grand-Prix Results
  Marianske Lazne Second 2009
  Marmande Third 2009
  St. Macaire First 2008

Team Championship
 2007  Morizes (5th) 32pts (Rode with Jannick de Jong, Theo Pijper, Erik Eijbergen)
 2008  Wertle (Second) 45pts (Rode with Jannick de Jong, Erik Eijbergen, Mark Stiekema)
 2009  Eenrum (Second) 46pts (Rode with Jannick de Jong, Theo Pijper, Mark Stiekema)
 2010  Morizes (Second) 42pts (Rode with Theo Pijper, Mark Stiekema, Sjoerd Rozenberg )
 2011 Did not compete
 2012 Did not compete
 2013  Folkestone (First) 65pts (Rode with Jannick de Jong, Theo Pijper, Mark Stiekema))
 2014  Forssa (Second) 41pts (Rode with Jannick de Jong, Theo Pijper, Henry van der Steen)
 2015 Did not compete
 2016  Marianske Lazne (First) 46pts (Rode with Jannick de Jong, Theo Pijper, Romano Hummel)

European Grasstrack Championship

Finalist
 2004  Eenrum (11th) 12pts
 2005  Schwarme (Second) 16pts
 2006  La Reole (Third) 14pts
 2007  Folkestone (5th) 14pts
 2008  Siddeburen (6th) 17pts
 2009  Berghaupten (8th) 12pts
 2010  La Reole (7th) 11pts
 2012  Eenrum (Second) 16pts
 2013  Bielefeld (Second) 11pts
 2014  St. Macaire (6th) 13pts
 2016  Folkestone (5th) 17pts

Semi-finalist
 2003  Eenrum (12th) 8pts
 2011  Staphorst (N/S)

Dutch Grasstrack Championship
 2002 (15th)
 2003 (14th)
 2004 (6th)
 2005 (4th)
 2006 (Second)
 2007 (5th)
 2008 (Champion)
 2009 (Champion)
 2010 (Champion)
 2011 (Second)
 2012 (13th)
 2013 (Second)
 2014 (Third)
 2015 (?)
 2016 (?)

References

Dutch speedway riders
Dutch motorcycle racers
1985 births
Living people
Individual Speedway Long Track World Championship riders
21st-century Dutch people